Chacho is a male nickname in Spanish-speaking countries, often a diminutive form of "muchacho". It may refer to:

People
 Chacho Peñaloza (1796–1863), Argentine military officer and politician
 Chacho (footballer) Eduardo González Valiño (1911–1979), Spanish footballer
 Chacho Vega (1945–2012), Bolivian footballer
 Chacho Álvarez (born 1948), Argentine politician
 Chacho Gaytán (born 1969), Mexican musician and composer

Other
 Chachos, tortilla chip snacks by Keebler

See also
 
 
 Muchacho (disambiguation)